Afrobeata firma is a species of jumping spider in the genus Afrobeata that lives in Yemen. It was first described by Wanda Wesołowska & Antonius van Harten in 1994.

References

Spiders of the Arabian Peninsula
Salticidae
Spiders described in 1994
Taxa named by Wanda Wesołowska